Magdalena Partido is a partido in the northeastern part of Buenos Aires Province in Argentina.

Settlements
Magdalena
General Mansilla (Estación Bartolomé Bavio)
Atalaya
Vieytes

References

External links

Partidos of Buenos Aires Province
States and territories established in 1611